Miss Marple's Final Cases and Two Other Stories is a short story collection written by Agatha Christie and first published in the UK by Collins Crime Club in October 1979 retailing at £4.50. It was the last Christie book to be published under the Collins Crime Club imprint although HarperCollins continue to be the writer's UK publishers.

The book contains eight short stories, six featuring Miss Marple and two other stories, and did not originally appear in the United States because most of the stories had been published earlier in the US in magazines. 

In 2010, an audio book and the Kindle edition were released, which included six stories from the book, plus Greenshaw's Folly.

List of stories 

 Sanctuary
 Strange Jest
 Tape-Measure Murder
 The Case of the Caretaker
 The Case of the Perfect Maid
 Miss Marple Tells a Story
 The Dressmaker's Doll
 In a Glass Darkly
 Greenshaw's Folly (added in new editions by Alexander Afgan)

Literary significance and reception

Robert Barnard: "Posthumous collection, containing several good Marple cases previously only available in the States. Also two supernatural stories, which Christie did not have the stylistic resources to bring off successfully."

Publication history

 1978, Ulverscroft Large-print Edition, Hardcover, 
 1979, Collins Crime Club (London), October 1979, Hardcover, 140 pp 
 1980, Fontana Books (Imprint of HarperCollins), Paperback
 2005, HarperCollins audio edition (CD)  / 9780007199259, UK edition, most recent of three audio editions
 2006, HarperCollins Hardcover  / 9780007208616 UK edition

Five paperback editions were issued from November 1980 to the most recent in April 2010 by Ulverscroft Large Print Books Ltd,  / 9781444802344.

This collection was issued for Kindle by HarperCollins in October 2010, ISBN B0046RE5FY and in July 2012, ISBN B008I5CNPE. The latest audio edition includes an additional short story, originally published in The Adventure of the Christmas Pudding collection, Greenshaw's Folly.

First publication of stories

The first magazine publication of each of the stories is as follows:
 Strange Jest: First published in This Week magazine in the US on 2 November 1941 and then in issue 643 of the Strand Magazine in July 1944 under the title of The Case of the Buried Treasure. (This was the final short story Christie wrote for the Strand.)
 The Tape-Measure Murder: First published in issue 614 of the Strand Magazine in February 1942 under the title of The Case of the Retired Jeweller.
 The Case of the Caretaker: First published in issue 613 of the Strand Magazine in January 1942.
 The Case of the Perfect Maid: First published in issue 616 of the Strand Magazine in April 1942 under the shortened title of The Perfect Maid.
 Sanctuary: First published in the October 1954 issue of Woman's Journal. This story was specially written by Christie for the Westminster Abbey restoration appeal fund of that year. The story was sold to the highest bidder with the funds going to the appeal. The Magazine did not state the sum that they paid but noted that it was "considerable".
 The Dressmaker's Doll: First published in the December 1958 issue of Woman's Journal.
 Miss Marple Tells a Story was not written for magazine publication initially but was a special commission from the BBC for a series called Short Story as announced in The Times on 27 March 1934. It is further unusual in that the story was read out by Christie herself, in the manner of her previous broadcasts of Behind the Screen (1930) and The Scoop (1931). The twenty-minute broadcast took place on Friday, 11 May 1934 at 9.20pm on the National Programme. The text was first published in Volume 3, Issue 64 of the weekly UK magazine Home Journal on 25 May 1935 under the title Behind Closed Doors and with an illustration by Michael Bernard.
 The Daily Mirror of 6 April 1934 stated that In a Glass Darkly was being read out by Christie on BBC Radio that night as part of the Short Story series. However, the programme billings on the same page stated the broadcast was by Dorothy L. Sayers with a story titled Dilemma and the Radio Times also states that this was the broadcast made. The text of Christie's story was first published in the December 1934 issue of the monthly Woman's Journal.

Adaptations 

The stories The Tape-Measure Murder, The Case of the Perfect Maid and Sanctuary were adapted as episodes for the BBC Radio 4 radio drama series Miss Marple's Final Cases, starring June Whitfield as Miss Marple and dramatised by Joy Wilkinson. Additionally, the plot of The Case of the Caretaker is referenced to by the character Raymond West, Miss Marple's nephew, in the episode The Case of the Perfect Maid. 

The stories Strange Jest, The Case of the Perfect Maid and The Tape-Measure Murder were adapted as episodes of the Japanese anime television series Agatha Christie's Great Detectives Poirot and Marple in 2004.

Greenshaw's Folly was adapted for the ITV Miss Marple series in 2013.

References

External links 
Miss Marple's Final Cases at the official Agatha Christie website

Miss Marple's Final Cases and two other stories at the new official Agatha Christie website

1979 short story collections
Miss Marple short story collections
Short story collections by Agatha Christie
Collins Crime Club books
Books published posthumously